Billawar is a town and a notified area committee in Kathua district of the Indian Union Territory of Jammu and Kashmir. 

Billawar was founded by Raja Bhog Pal in the 7th century A.D., it was a kingdom and its capital was Basohli until the 11th century.

Geography
Billawar town is situated in the lap of the Shivalik mountains between the banks of the Naz and Bheeni rivulets, approximately 70 km from Dayala Chak on Delhi-Jammu NH-1A.

Billawar tehsil
The Billawar tehsil (1 of 8 tehsils) of Kathua district has 46 panchayat villages.

History
Raja Bhog Pal, a son of the king of Kullu Valley, founded Basohli and established Billawar as the capital in 765 A.D. after subduing Rana Billo, a feudal chief who once ruled the area. The ruling house was subsequently known as Balouria, deriving from Balor. The old name of Billawar is "Bilawara".

Demographics 
As of the 2011 India census, Billawar had a population of 11,916. Billawar has two boroughs - old Billawar town and Phinter area. Males constitute 56% of the population and females 44%. Billawar has an average literacy rate of 72%, higher than the national average of 59.5%; with male literacy rate of 78% and female literacy rate of 58%. 12% of the population is under six years of age. The major religions in Billawar are Hinduism (88.2%) and Islam (9.7%).

References

Cities and towns in Kathua district